The British Academy Television Awards are given out by the British Academy of Film and Television Arts (BAFTA). They are informally known as the BAFTA TV Awards. They have been awarded since 1954.

From 1968-1997, the BAFTA TV Awards and the BAFTA Film Awards were presented in one joint ceremony. Since 1998, there have been two separate ceremonies. The film awards are held in February, two weeks ahead of the Academy Awards (Oscars) in America, while the Television awards are held in late May. The BAFTA TV Award is the UK equivalent to the Emmy Award in the United States.

The awards for Best Supporting Actor and Best Supporting Actress were first presented at the 2010 ceremony.

Winners and nominees

2010s
{| class="wikitable" 
|-style="background:#bebebe;"
! style="width:5%;"| Year
! style="width:20%;"| Actors
! style="width:25%;"| Work
! style="width:20%;"| Character
! style="width:12%;"| Network
|-
|rowspan=5 style="text-align:center"| 2010 (56th)
|-style="background:#B0C4DE;"
| Matthew Macfadyen
|Criminal Justice
| Joe Miller
| BBC One
|-
|Tom Hollander 
|Gracie!
| Monty Banks
| BBC Four
|-
|Benedict Cumberbatch 
|Small Island
| Bernard Bligh
| BBC One
|-
|Gary Lewis
|Mo
| Adam Ingram
| Channel 4
|-
|rowspan=5 style="text-align:center"| 2011 (57th)
|-style="background:#B0C4DE;"
| Martin Freeman
|Sherlock
| Dr. John Watson
| BBC One
|-
|Brendan Coyle 
|Downton Abbey
| John Bates
| ITV
|-
|Johnny Harris
|This is England '86
| Michael "Mick" Jenkins
| Channel 4
|-
|Robert Sheehan
|Misfits
| Nathan Young
| E4
|-
|rowspan=5 style="text-align:center"| 2012 (58th)
|-style="background:#B0C4DE;"
| Andrew Scott
|Sherlock
| Jim Moriarty
| BBC One
|-
|Stephen Rea
|The Shadow Line
| Gatehouse
| BBC Two
|-
| Martin Freeman
|Sherlock
| Dr. John Watson
| rowspan="2"|BBC One
|-
|Joseph Mawle
|Birdsong
|  Jack Firebrace
|-
|rowspan=5 style="text-align:center"| 2013 (59th)
|-style="background:#B0C4DE;"
| Simon Russell Beale
|"Henry IV, Parts I & II": The Hollow Crown
| Falstaff
| BBC Two
|-
|Harry Lloyd 
| The Fear
| Matty Beckett
| Channel 4
|-
|Stephen Graham
|Accused
| Tony
| BBC One
|-
|Peter Capaldi 
|The Hour
| Randall Brown
| BBC Two
|-
|rowspan=5 style="text-align:center"| 2014 (60th)
|-style="background:#B0C4DE;"
| David Bradley
|Broadchurch
| Jack Marshall
| ITV
|-
|Jerome Flynn
|Ripper Street
| Detective Sergeant Bennet Drake
| rowspan="2"|BBC One
|-
|Nico Mirallegro
|The Village
| Joe Middleton
|-
|Rory Kinnear
|Southcliffe
| David Whitehead
| Channel 4
|-
|rowspan=5 style="text-align:center"| 2015 (61st)
|-style="background:#B0C4DE;"
| Stephen Rea
|The Honourable Woman
| Sir Hugh Hayden-Hoyle
| BBC Two
|-
|Adeel Akhtar
|Utopia
| Wilson Wilson
| Channel 4
|-
|James Norton
|Happy Valley
| Tommy Lee Royce
| rowspan="2"|BBC One
|-
|Ken Stott
|The Missing
| Ian Garrett
|-
|rowspan=5 style="text-align:center"| 2016 (62nd)
|-style="background:#B0C4DE;"
| Tom Courtenay
|Unforgotten
| Eric Slater
| ITV
|-
|Ian McKellen
|The Dresser
| Norman
| Channel 4
|-
|Anton Lesser
|Wolf Hall
| Thomas More
| rowspan="2"|BBC Two
|-
|Cyril Nri
|Cucumber
| Lance Sullivan
|-
|rowspan=5 style="text-align:center"| 2017 (63rd)
|-style="background:#B0C4DE;"
| Tom Hollander
| The Night Manager
| Major "Corky" Lance Corkoran
| BBC One
|-
|Daniel Mays
|Line of Duty
| Danny Waldron
| BBC Two
|-
|Jared Harris
| rowspan="2"|The Crown
| King George VI
| rowspan="2"|Netflix
|-
|John Lithgow
| Winston Churchill
|-
|rowspan=5 style="text-align:center"| 2018 (64th)
|-style="background:#B0C4DE;"
| Brían F. O'Byrne
|Little Boy Blue
| Steve Jones
| ITV
|-
| Adrian Dunbar
| Line of Duty
| Ted Hastings
| BBC One
|-
|Anupam Kher
|The Boy With The Topknot
| Sathnam’s Father
| BBC Two
|-
|Jimmi Simpson
|Black Mirror: USS Callister
| James "Wally" Walton
| Netflix
|-
|rowspan=5 style="text-align:center"| 2019 (65th)|-style="background:#B0C4DE;"
| Ben Whishaw| A Very English Scandal| Norman Josiffe| BBC One|-
|Alex Jennings
|Unforgotten
| Tim Finch
| ITV
|-
|Kim Bodnia
|Killing Eve
| Konstantin Vasiliev
| BBC One
|-
|Stephen Graham
|Save Me
| Fabio "Melon" Melonzola
| Sky Atlantic
|-
|}

2020s

Superlatives

Actors with multiple wins and nominations

Multiple nominations
The following people have been nominated for the British Academy Television Award for Best Supporting Actor multiple times:3 nominationsStephen Graham2 nominationsMartin Freeman
Tom Hollander
Matthew Macfadyen
Stephen Rea

Programmes with multiple wins and nominations

Multiple Awards2 awardsSherlock

Multiple Nominations4 nominationsThe Crown3 nominationsIt's a Sin
Sherlock2 nominations'Line of DutyUnforgotten''

References

Supporting Actor
 
Television awards for Best Supporting Actor